Conservation in Ireland may refer to:

Conservation in the Republic of Ireland
List of Special Areas of Conservation in Northern Ireland
National nature reserves in Northern Ireland